Covert conditioning is an approach to mental health treatment that uses the principles of applied behavior analysis, or cognitive-behavior therapies (CBTs) to assist people in making improvements in their behavior or inner experience. The method relies on the person's capacity to use imagery for purposes such as mental rehearsal. In some populations, it has been found that an imaginary reward can be as effective as a real one. Effective covert conditioning is said to rely upon careful application of behavioral treatment principles such as a thorough behavioral analysis.

Some clinicians include the mind's ability to spontaneously generate imagery that can provide intuitive solutions or even reprocessing that improves people's typical reactions to situations or inner material. However, this goes beyond the behavioristic principles on which covert conditioning is based.

Therapies and self-help methods have aspects of covert conditioning. This can be seen in focusing, some neuro-linguistic programming methods such as future pacing, and various visualization or imaginal processes used in behavior therapies, such as CBTs or clinical behavior analysis.

Therapeutic interventions
"Systematic desensitization" associates an aversive stimulus with a behavior the client wishes to reduce or eliminate. This is done by imagining the target behavior followed by imagining an aversive consequence. "Covert extinction" attempts to reduce a behavior by imagining the target behavior while imagining that the reinforcer does not occur. "Covert response cost" attempts to reduce a behavior by associating the loss of a reinforcer with the target behavior that is to be decreased.

"Contact desensitization" is intended to increase a behavior by imagining a reinforcing experience in connection with modeling the correct behavior. "Covert negative reinforcement" attempts to increase a behavior by connecting the termination of an aversive stimulus with increased production of a target behavior.

"Dialectical behavior therapy" (DBT) and "Acceptance and commitment therapy" (ACT) uses positive reinforcement and covert conditioning through mindfulness. Although the therapies are quite similar in theory and practice, DBT is based on the cognitive psychology philosophy that thoughts and feelings are explanations of motor behavior, whereas ACT—rooted in behavior analysis—views thinking and feelings as more behavior to be explained.

Effectiveness
Previous research in the early 1990s has shown covert conditioning to be effective with sex offenders as part of a behavior modification treatment package. Clinical studies continue to find it effective with some generalization from office to natural environment with this population.

See also
Covert hypnosis

Notes

References
 Cautela, Joseph R and Kearney, Albert J. (1990) "Behavior analysis, cognitive therapy, and covert conditioning", Journal of behavior therapy and experimental psychiatry, 21 (2), pp. 83–90.

Behaviorism